Brandywine Creek may refer to:

Canada
Brandywine Creek (British Columbia), a tributary of the Cheakamus River

United States
Brandywine Creek (Big Blue River), in Indiana
Brandywine Creek (St. Joseph River tributary), in Michigan
Brandywine Creek (Broken Sword Creek tributary), Crawford County, Ohio
Brandywine Creek (Cuyahoga River tributary), in Summit County, Ohio
Brandywine Creek (Quittapahilla Creek tributary), in Lebanon County, Pennsylvania
Brandywine Creek (Christina River tributary), in Chester County, Pennsylvania and New Castle County, Delaware
East Branch Brandywine Creek, in Chester County, Pennsylvania
West Branch Brandywine Creek, in Chester County, Pennsylvania
Brandywine Creek State Park, in New Castle County, Delaware
Battle of Brandywine Creek, during the American Revolutionary War (1777)

See also
Brandywine (disambiguation)
Baranduin or Brandywine River, a river in Middle-earth in the fiction of J. R. R. Tolkien
Brandywine Falls (disambiguation)